John McGreer was a member of the Wisconsin State Assembly.

Biography
McGreer was born on May 5, 1849 in Jordan, Wisconsin. He moved to Sharon, Portage County, Wisconsin in 1865 and to Antigo, Wisconsin in 1893. McGreer was a farmer and a real estate dealer by trade.

Political career
McGreer was a member of the Assembly during the 1899 session. Other positions he held include chairman (similar to mayor) of the town board (similar to city council) and town clerk of Antigo and justice of the peace. He was a Democrat.

References

People from Jordan, Wisconsin
People from Portage County, Wisconsin
People from Antigo, Wisconsin
Mayors of places in Wisconsin
Wisconsin city council members
City and town clerks
American justices of the peace
Farmers from Wisconsin
1849 births
Year of death missing
Democratic Party members of the Wisconsin State Assembly